The Road to Freedom is singer Chris de Burgh's 15th original album, released in 2004. It was the first album released after he left A&M, who had released all of de Burgh's previous albums and singles.

Track listing
All compositions by Chris de Burgh except as noted.
"When Winter Comes" – 3:48
"The Road to Freedom" – 4:26
"Snow Is Falling" – 3:53
"The Words 'I Love You'" – 3:26
"Songbird" – 4:00
"Five Past Dreams" – 3:48
"Here for You" – 3:41
"What You Mean to Me" – 3:29 (music: Phil Palmer, lyrics: de Burgh)
"Rose of England" – 5:14
"The Journey" – 3:52
"Read My Name" – 4:16
"Even Now" - 4:09 (Special Edition Only)
"Kiss Me from a Distance - 3:22 (Special Edition Only)
"Little Angel" - 3:10 (Special Edition Only)
"Once Upon a Time - 3:39 (Special Edition Only)

Personnel 

 Chris de Burgh – lead and backing vocals, acoustic piano, guitars
 Chris Cameron – acoustic piano (1, 3), orchestral arrangements (1, 3, 7)
 Peter Gordeno – keyboards
 Phil Palmer – guitars
 Rick Mitra – bass
 Danny Cummings – drums, percussion
 Gavyn Wright – orchestral leader
 Isobel Griffiths – orchestral contractor

Production 

 Produced by Chris de Burgh and Chris Porter
 Engineered and Mixed by Chris Porter
 Photography – David Morley
 Sleeve Design – Chris de Burgh, Kenny Thomson and Mike McCraith.
 Art Direction – M+H Communications Ltd.
 Management – Kenny Thomson Management, Inc.

Chris de Burgh albums
2004 albums